Augusto do Rosário Rodrigues was a Goan short-story writer and poet.

Life

Very little is known about the life of Augusto do Rosário Rodrigues. He was born in 1910 and appears to have been an advocate by profession. He "appears to have passed away in 1999".
He was born in the village of Benaulim, South Goa. Many roads in Benaulim are named after him following his death

Work

Rodrigues produced short stories for the "Renascença" programme of All-India Radio, which were later collected and published in a collection entitled Contos Regionais, or "Regional Stories", in 1987. Given that this title was also used by the Goan short-story writer José da Silva Coelho, whose work was rediscovered by Devi and Seabra, there is a possibility that Rodrigues was giving a sly wink back to his predecessor. Two of his stories have been translated into English: O Capitão Tarimbeiro (as Risen from the Ranks) and O Herdeiro dos Cabrais (as The Scion of the Cabral Family).

Themes

Many of Rodrigues's stories are historical, ranging from the eighteenth century right up until his present day. Focussing on Goa's Catholic community, his stories often revolve around issues of decline and recovery. The Goan critic Bailon de Sá described his collection as showing a sort of "inside out exoticism".

References

Writers from Goa
20th-century Indian short story writers
Portuguese-language writers
Indian male short story writers
1910 births
Year of death missing
People from Benaulim
20th-century Indian male writers